El Calabacito is a corregimiento in Los Pozos District, Herrera Province, Panama with a population of 617 as of 2010. Its population as of 1990 was 703; its population as of 2000 was 692.

References

Corregimientos of Herrera Province